Jeremy Rapke is a lawyer who was the Director of Public Prosecutions in Victoria from 2007 until his resignation in 2011 after an inquiry into his conduct in that office.

References 

Living people
21st-century Australian lawyers
Year of birth missing (living people)
Place of birth missing (living people)